The Mashū class is a series of replenishment oilers of the Japan Maritime Self-Defense Force. They were built from 2002 to 2004. The ships have the hull designator AOE.

The Mashū class was designed as an enlarged, improved version of the Towada-class fast combat support ships. The vessels are capable of mounting 2 Phalanx CIWS by design. They are in commission from 2004 onwards.

List of ships

Gallery

References

External links

Auxiliary replenishment ship classes
Auxiliary ships of the Japan Maritime Self-Defense Force
Ships built by Hitachi Zosen Corporation